The Río de Oro (River of Gold) is a river which flows in northeast Morocco to reach the Mediterranean Sea at the harbour of the Spanish exclave of Melilla.

Río de Oro
Rivers of Spain
Rivers of Morocco